Ibrahim Hijazi (born 22 July 1977) is an Israeli Arab politician who briefly served as a member of the Knesset for the Joint List in 2017.

Background
Hijazi was born in Nazareth. He studied at the University of Haifa, completing a bachelor's degree in psychology and went on to earn a master's degree in educational psychology at Ben-Gurion University of the Negev. He also gained a Certificate in Organizational Development from Bar-Ilan University.

A member of the Southern Branch of the Islamic Movement and the United Arab List, Hijazi was placed sixteenth on the list of the Joint List (an alliance of predominantly Arab parties) for the 2015 Knesset elections. Although the alliance won only 13 seats, Hijazi entered the Knesset on 20 September 2017 as a replacement for Osama Saadi as part of a rotation agreement between the parties in the alliance. However, he resigned from the Knesset in October 2017 and was replaced by Youssef Atauna on 25 October.

References

External links

1977 births
Living people
Arab members of the Knesset
Ben-Gurion University of the Negev alumni
Islamic Movement in Israel politicians
Israeli Muslims
Israeli people of Saudi Arabian descent
Israeli psychologists
Joint List politicians
Members of the 20th Knesset (2015–2019)
Politicians from Nazareth
United Arab List politicians
University of Haifa alumni